The Mystery of Mr. X is a 1934 American pre-Code crime film starring Robert Montgomery as a jewel thief who gets mixed up in a series of murders in  London. It is based on the 1933 novel X v. Rex by Philip MacDonald (under the pen name Martin Porlock), was remade in 1952 as The Hour of 13.

Plot
London police constables are being killed by a man calling himself "Mr. X" (Leonard Mudie). By chance, one of the murders occurs around the same time and place as a diamond robbery, leading Police Commissioner Sir Herbert Frensham (Henry Stephenson) to suspect the same man is responsible for both, much to the annoyance of the thief, Nicholas "Nick" Revel (Robert Montgomery), and his confederates, taxi driver Joseph "Joe" Palmer (Forrester Harvey) and insurance clerk Hutchinson (Ivan F. Simpson).

After another slaying, Sir Christopher Marche is arrested as a suspect, as he had drunkenly quarreled with the latest victim shortly before his death. However, Nick provides him with an alibi. As a result, he becomes acquainted with Marche's grateful fiancée (and the commissioner's daughter), Jane Frensham (Elizabeth Allan). The two are attracted to each other.

Meanwhile, Sir Herbert becomes convinced that Nick is Mr. X and puts him under constant surveillance. When the commissioner learns that his daughter has gone alone to Nick's flat, he sends Marche a message supposedly from Nick urgently requesting that they meet. When Marche finds the couple alone together, though they are not doing anything untoward, he breaks off his engagement with Jane.

Nick decides to give up his life of crime for Jane. He mails back the jewel. However, when Joe warns him that Hutchinson has been picked up for questioning, he realizes that it is only a matter of time before his associate gives him up. Nick discovers that the locations of the murders form an X, which provides him with the site of the next crime. He disguises himself as a policeman and flushes the real killer out. After a struggle, Mr. X is fatally injured, but before he dies, he boasts to Sir Herbert how close he came to fulfilling his goal of one murder for each of the 15 years he spent in prison.

Cast
 Robert Montgomery as Nicholas Revel
 Elizabeth Allan as Jane Frensham
 Lewis Stone as Supt. Connor
 Ralph Forbes as Sir Christopher Marche
 Henry Stephenson as Sir Herbert Frensham
 Forrester Harvey as Joseph Horatio Palmer
 Ivan F. Simpson as Hutchinson 
 Leonard Mudie as Mr. X
 Alec B. Francis as Judge Malpas
 Charles Irwin as Willis
 Claude King as Cummings

References

External links
 
 
 
 

1934 films
1934 crime films
American crime films
American heist films
American black-and-white films
Films based on British novels
Films directed by Edgar Selwyn
Films directed by Ryszard Bolesławski
Films set in London
Metro-Goldwyn-Mayer films
American serial killer films
1930s heist films
1930s serial killer films
1930s English-language films
1930s American films